Storeidet Col is a prominent col situated 3.5 nautical miles (6 km) west of Eidshaugane Peaks in the central Humboldt Mountains, Queen Maud Land. Discovered and photographed by the German Antarctic Expedition, 1938–39. Mapped by Norway from air photos and surveys by Norwegian Antarctic Expedition, 1956–60, and named Storeidet (the great isthmus).

Mountain passes of Queen Maud Land
Humboldt Mountains (Antarctica)